Lean on Me may refer to:

Music

Albums
Lean on Me (album), by Shirley Scott, 1972
Lean on Me (EP), by Consumed by Fire, 2015
Lean on Me, by Hanoi Rocks, 1992

Songs
"Lean on Me" (song), by Bill Withers, 1972
"Lean on Me" (Cheat Codes song), 2021
"Lean on Me" (Kirk Franklin song), 1998
"Lean on Me (Ah-Li-Ayo)", by Red Box, 1985
"Lean on Me", by the Housemartins from London 0 Hull 4, 1986
"Lean on Me", by Illy, 2019
"Lean on Me", by Limp Bizkit from Greatest Hitz, 2005
"Lean on Me", by Melba Moore from This Is It, 1976
"Lean on Me", by the Redskins, 1983
"Lean on Me", by Sandro Cavazza, 2020
"Lean on Me (Tonight)", by the Moody Blues from Keys of the Kingdom, 1991

Film and television
Lean on Me (film), a 1989 film directed by John G. Avildsen
"Lean on Me" (The L Word: Generation Q), a 2021 television episode